Daniel "Dan" McCormick (born May 30, 1986) is a judoka from the United States who competed in the 2008 Summer Olympics.

References

External links 
 
 US Judo
 Facebook

Olympic judoka of the United States
Living people
1986 births
Place of birth missing (living people)
Judoka at the 2008 Summer Olympics
American male judoka